The 1983 Badminton World Cup was the fifth edition of an international tournament Badminton World Cup. The event was held in Kuala Lumpur, Malaysia from 16 August to 21 August 1983. China won titles in 3 disciplines : Both the singles events and Women's doubles. South Korea won Men's doubles while cross country pair from Denmark and England won the mixed doubles title.

Medalists

Men's singles

Finals

Women's singles

Finals

Men's doubles

Finals

Women's doubles

Finals

Mixed doubles

Finals

References 
 https://web.archive.org/web/20061214225003/http://tangkis.tripod.com/world/1983.htm
 3rd Quartz Alba World Cup Badminton Championships
 'Iceman' versus Frost
 Halbfinalresultate
 Finalresultate

Badminton World Cup
1983 in badminton
1983 in Malaysian sport
Sport in Kuala Lumpur
International sports competitions hosted by Malaysia